Joel Abbot or Joel Abbott may refer to:

Joel Abbot (naval officer) (1793–1855), United States Navy officer
Joel Abbot (politician) (1776–1826), American politician from Georgia
Joel Abbot (fl. 2010s), member of Australian rock band Bleeding Knees Club
Lt. Joel Abbott (fl. 1860s), of the 8th Va. Cavalry (Confederate), participant in the Battle of Charleston (1862)
Joel Abbott (fl. 1790s–1800s), original owner of the historic Robert Toombs House